Anderson Scarp is an upward slope and cliff  high, about  west of Hall Bluff on the Dais, Wright Valley, in the McMurdo Dry Valleys of Antarctica. It was named by the Advisory Committee on Antarctic Names in 2004 after Kent Anderson of the Albuquerque Seismological Laboratory, U.S. Geological Survey, from 1992. He played a key role in the installation of the VNDA seismograph station at Bull Pass, near Lake Vanda, in the early 1990s.

References 

Cliffs of Victoria Land
McMurdo Dry Valleys